Lūcija is a feminine given name found in Latvia.

Notable people with the name include:
 Lūcija Garūta (1902–1977), Latvian pianist, poet and composer
 Lūcija Jēruma-Krastiņa (1899–1968), Latvian anatomist and anthropologist

See also
 Lucija
 Lucia (name)